Events from the year 1734 in Great Britain.

Incumbents
 Monarch – George II
 Prime Minister – Robert Walpole (Whig)
 Parliament – 7th (until 17 April), 8th (starting 13 June)

Events
 22 April to 6 June – general election results in Robert Walpole winning his third victory as Prime Minister.

Undated
 George Sale produces a translation of the Koran into English.
 The Bank of England moves to its present location in Threadneedle Street in London.
 Society of Dilettanti founded in London.
 Construction of Holkham Hall in Norfolk begins.
 Engraving Copyright Act ('Hogarth's Act') passed by Parliament to protect original engravings against unauthorized copies.

Births
 24 June – David Brown, merchant and Governor of Tranquebar (died 1804)
 3 September – Joseph Wright, painter (died 1797)
 7 October – Sir Ralph Abercromby, general (died 1801)
 15 December – George Romney, painter (died 1802)

Deaths
 6 January – John Dennis, dramatist and critic (born 1658)
 1 February – John Floyer, physician and writer (born 1649)
 1 March – Roger North, biographer (born 1653)
 21 March – Robert Wodrow, historian (born 1679)
 4 May – James Thornhill, painter (born 1675 or 1676)
 12 June – James FitzJames, 1st Duke of Berwick, illegitimate son of James II of England and French military commander (born 1670 in France; died in Germany)
 22 July – Peter King, 1st Baron King, Lord Chancellor (born c. 1669)
 14 November – Louise de Kérouaille, Duchess of Portsmouth, mistress of Charles II of England (born 1649 in France; died in France)
 6 December – Abigail Masham, Baroness Masham, courtier (born c. 1670)
 28 December – Robert Roy MacGregor, Scottish clan chief (born 1671)

References

 
Years in Great Britain